Bejarano is a Spanish surname. Notable people with the surname include:

Alejandro Bejarano (born 1984), Argentine footballer
César Bejarano (born 1941), Paraguayan fencer
Cristián Bejarano (born 1981), Mexican boxer
Danny Bejarano (born 1994), Bolivian footballer
Diego Bejarano (born 1991), Bolivian footballer
Diego Murillo Bejarano (born 1961), Colombian leader of the United Self-Defense Forces of Colombia
Edna Béjarano (born 1951), German singer
Esther Béjarano (1924–2021), German Nazi concentration camp survivor
Eusebio Bejarano (born 1948), Spanish footballer
Fernando Niño Bejarano (born 1974), Spanish footballer
Gustavo Noboa Bejarano (born 1937), Ecuadorian politician
Jessica Bejarano, American conductor
Marvin Bejarano (born 1988), Bolivian footballer
Miguel Bejarano Moreno (born 1967), Spanish sculptor
Rafael Bejarano (born 1982), American jockey
Rafael Guerra Bejarano (1862–1941), Spanish bullfighter
René Bejarano (born 1957), Mexican politician

See also
José María Martín Bejarano-Serrano (born 1987), Spanish footballer
Juan de Acuña y Bejarano, 2nd Marquis of Casa Fuerte (1658–1734), Spanish military officer

Spanish-language surnames